Nedstrand (locally, Stranda) is a village in Tysvær municipality in Rogaland county, Norway. The village is on the Nedstrand peninsula's southeast coast, at the confluence of the Nedstrandsfjorden and Vindafjorden. The village of Hindaråvåg lies just west of Nedstrand, and Nedstrand Church is there.

The village is a regular ferry stop on routes to the Sjernarøyane islands (across the Nedstrandsfjorden) and to Hebnes (across the Vindafjorden). Both of those stops have other connections all over the region.

The area was historically part of the municipality of Nedstrand, and was a regional customs office for the huge timber industry in the Ryfylke district. Today, the area is home to agriculture, fish farming, fruit orchards, and stone quarries.

In 1983, the oil rig Alexander L. Kielland was scuttled in the Nedstrandsfjorden after it had capsized in the North Sea in 1980, killing 123 people.

Notable residents
 Anders Andersen Bjelland (1790–1850) farmer & politician
 Niels Henrik Abel (1802–1829) mathematician
 Osmund Osmundson (born 1826 – ??) the founder of Nerstrand, Minnesota
 Rudi "Njål" London (born 1949), Recording artist/Photo journalist/Author, born at Nedre Helle in Nedstrand, later lived in Nashville, Tennessee, U.S.

References

Villages in Rogaland
Tysvær